Kakushin Sētō  means reformist party or progressive party in English. Kakushin Sētō is generally 'anti-conservative', and in Japan, it has generally referred to democratic socialist, social democratic and socially progressive parties that respect parliamentary democracy. Japan's "progressive parties" are basically opposed to constitutional amendments led by right-wing conservatives, so they are partly in solidarity with "liberal parties".

In general, while the Liberal Democratic Party has a strong conservative tendency and the Communist Party has shown a strong progressive tendency. in the Japanese political spectrum. In the 21st century, not only traditional democratic socialist parties but also some progressive liberal parties began to be regarded as part of the Kakushin Sētō in the Japanese political context.

List of Kakushin Sētō

During the Japanese Empire 
 1926: During this period, as the proletarian movement was activated, the legitimate socialist party Labour-Farmer Party was founded.
 1926: At that time, moderate socialists who were compliant with the system formed the Social Democratic Party. At that time, it showed the relatively most conservative tendency among Japan's three major proletarian parties.
 1928: The Labour-Farmer Party was forcibly disbanded as the government launched a massive crackdown on socialist forces.
 1932: Moderate leftists supporting the constitutional rule of the Japanese Empire founded Shakai Taishūtō.
 1940: With the establishment of a one-party system led by the Shōwa statist Imperial Rule Assistance Association (IRAA), Shakai Taishūtō was absorbed into IRAA, and all other Kakushin Sētō were banned.

Post-war Japan 
 1945: After the end of World War II, Japan's non-communist socialist forces united to form the Japan Socialist Party.
 1945: Around December, Japan's militaristic system collapsed and Western democracy was introduced, making the Japanese Communist Party legal.
 1950: After World War II, the U.S. military ruled Okinawa, and the opposing left-wing forces founded the Okinawa Social Mass Party.
 1996: Japan Socialist Party changed its name to Social Democratic Party.
 2017: When the centrist/liberal Democratic Party attempted to be reasonable with the constitutionalist (supporting the constitutional amendment) right-wing party Kibō no Tō, led by Yuriko Koike, progressive-liberals and constitutionalists in the party against it create the liberal-leaning Constitutional Democratic Party of Japan.
 2019: When the "Liberal Party" attempted to merge with the centrist/liberal-conservative "Democratic Party for the People", left-wing liberals who opposed it founded Reiwa Shinsengumi.
 2020: The liberal-leaning "Constitutional Democratic Party of Japan" (old CDP) of Japan was reasonable with the centrist/liberal-conservative "Democratic Party for the People", and the new party's name was "Constitutional Democratic Party of Japan" (new CDP)

Controversy 
The terms "Kakushin" or "left-wing" (左派) have been criticized for being misused by mainstream Japanese media and Japanese conservatives as red-baiting terms to attack South Korean liberals. The reason is that South Korean liberals have anti-Japan sentiment for historical reasons. For example, by South Korean political standards, the DPK does not classify the Democratic Party of Korea (DPK) as a "jinbojeongdang" because it is generally considered a socially conservative rather than the U.S. Democratic Party, but it is common for the U.S. Democratic Party to classify it as a "jinbojeongdang". However, even though major Japanese media rarely refer to the U.S. Democratic Party as "Kakushin Sētō", they often refer to the Democratic Party of Korea as "Kakushin Sētō".

South Korean liberals are criticizing these mainstream Japanese media and Japanese conservatives. According to Moon Chung-in, Japanese conservatives pointed out that referring to South Korean liberals as "Kakushin" is red-baiting, equating them with the Japan Socialist Party and the Japanese Communist Party. Moon Chung-in also said that Moon Jae-in government and DPK support "Gaehyeok" (改革) in the South Korean political context, but not "Kakushin" (革新) in the Japanese political context.

See also 
 Anti-neoliberalism
 Antimilitarism
 Chunichi Shimbun
 Hyukshinkye (South Korea)
 Left-wing populism
 Liberalism in Japan
 New Left in Japan - In the 1960s, Japan's "New Left" criticized Kakushin Sētō by calling him "Old Left".
 Pacifism
 Reformism

References 

 
Anti-militarism
Pacifism
Political terminology in Japan
Social democratic parties in Japan